Warm and Tender is the fourteenth studio album and first of children's lullabies released by Olivia Newton-John in September 1989. After being absent on Newton-John's last album The Rumour, producer John Farrar returned for this album. After recording extensively in the U.K. and U.S. throughout her career, this was Newton-John's first album recorded in her hometown of Melbourne.

"Reach Out for Me" peaked at number 153 on the ARIA Charts.

Track listing

Personnel

Musicians
 Olivia Newton-John – vocals, arrangements (2, 4, 6, 8, 10, 13, 15)
 The Victorian Philharmonic Orchestra:
 Rudolf Osadnik – leader
 Ron Layton – contractor
 Joe Chindamo – acoustic piano, keyboards
 Adrian Scott – programming
 Ben Robertson – bass
 Don Stevenson – drums
 Robert Clarke – percussion 
 Alex Pertout – percussion
 Vernon Hill – flute
 Vicki Philipson – oboe
 Stephen Robinson – Cor anglais
 Julie Rains – harp

Other musicians
 "Warm and Tender" – all instruments by Brian Mann and John Farrar
 "Reach Out for Me" – all instruments by Brian Mann and John Farrar; Synclavier by Sean Callery
 "The Flower That Shattered the Stone" – synthesizers by Brian Mann; Synclavier by Sean Callery

Production
 Producer – John Farrar
 Engineer – Allan Sides
 Additional engineering – Ian McKenzie
 Assistant engineer – Eric Rudd
 Recorded at the Melbourne Concert Hall and Metropolis Audio (Melbourne, Australia); Ocean Way Recording (Los Angeles, CA).
 Mixed by Allen Sides at Ocean Way Recording.
 Mastered by Bernie Grundman at Bernie Grundman Mastering (Hollywood, CA).
 Album art direction – Gabrielle Raumberger
 Album logo and design – Larry Vigon Studio
 Front cover photography – Alberto Tolot
 Dust sleeve photography – Nancy Manning

Charts

References

1989 albums
Olivia Newton-John albums
Albums produced by John Farrar
Children's music albums by Australian artists
Children's music albums by British artists
Geffen Records albums